Psygmatocerus wagleri is a species of beetle in the family Cerambycidae. It was described by Perty in 1828.

References

Torneutini
Beetles described in 1828